Zimbabwe competed at the 2004 Summer Paralympics in Athens, Greece. The team included one man and one woman. Competitors from Zimbabwe won 1 gold to finish 57th in the medal table.

Medallists

Sports

Athletics

Men's track

Women's field

See also
Zimbabwe at the Paralympics
Zimbabwe at the 2004 Summer Olympics

References 

Nations at the 2004 Summer Paralympics
2004
Summer Paralympics